Tropical Storm Hazel was a weak East Pacific tropical cyclone that caused heavy damage in Mexico. The costliest storm of the 1965 Pacific hurricane season, it formed from a northward-moving disturbance that originated southeast of Socorro Island. After reaching tropical storm strength on the Saffir–Simpson Hurricane Scale, the cyclone turned to the east-northeast. The storm made landfall near Mazatlán on September 26 and quickly transitioned an extratropical cyclone. Although fairly weak, the system was responsible for causing heavy damage to the Mexican economy. Flooding in Mazatlán washed out many houses and submerged others in muddy water. At least six people died with damages totaling $10 million (1965 USD) and possibly higher. The name Hazel was retired following this storm, likely due to the Atlantic storm of the same name.

Meteorological history
On September 22, a weak tropical disturbance was first observed southeast of Socorro Island. Later on September 24, satellite imagery suggested winds of up to  near the center. The storm then moved towards the east-northeast and made landfall just south of Mazatlán on September 26 and transitioned into an extratropical cyclone shortly thereafter.

Preparations, impact, and aftermath
Since meteorologists were expecting Hazel to remain away from land, many residents were unprepared for the storm. However, 10,000 people fled the low-lying areas of Mazatlán. Substantial damage was recorded in the city Many rivers overflowed its banks, and roughly 5,000 people were without shelter. The entire city of Mazatlán was without power and the city water system was damaged. At least 50 boats were damaged or sunk by the storm. The damage from the storm was estimated to be at least $10 million (1965 USD), making Hazel the costliest tropical cyclone of the season. Three people were reported killed in Mazatlán, two fishermen died when attempted to ride out the storm, and a boy who was electrocuted by a downed power line. Three additional deaths from electrocutions were reported in a rural section of Nayarit. Due to a communications breakdown, no word was received about six vacationers in Mazatlán. The city was only reachable by boat. The cyclone also had a major impact on the coastal economy since Mazatlán's shrimp fleet, which makes up the base of the city's economy. In southern Sinaloa,  of cotton, corn, and sorghum were lost. There were also reports of heavy losses to livestock.

After the storm, 1,000 people were sought shelter in schools; in the farm areas of Barron and El Wailamo, people were taking refuge on top of trees and homes. Army units and relief agencies rushed to provide aid to coastal cities. The name Hazel was retired; the name was replaced with Heather in 1969.

See also

List of Pacific hurricanes
Other tropical cyclones named Hazel

References

Eastern Pacific tropical storms
1965 Pacific hurricane season
Pacific hurricanes in Mexico